Huigang of Silla (died 838) (r. 836–838) was the 43rd ruler of the Korean kingdom of Silla.  He was the grandson of King Wonseong and the son of ichan Kim Heon-jeong by Lady Podo.  He married Lady Munmok, who was the daughter of daeachan Chunggong.

After the death of King Heungdeok in 836, Huigang and his uncle (Heungdeok's younger cousine) Kim Gyunjeong struggled for power.  After Kim Myeong (who later became King Minae) killed Kim, Huigang rose to the throne.

Huigang made Kim Myeong his Sangdaedeung, but the next year Kim rebelled against him.  Huigang killed himself, and was buried on Sosan mountain in Gyeongju.

Family 

 Grandfather: Wonseong of Silla
 Grandmother: Queen Kim (Lady Yeonhwa)(숙정부인 김씨), of the Kim clan, the daughter of
 Father:  Prince Hyechung (혜충태자) (750–791/792)
 Mother: Concubine Park (포도부인 박씨)
 Wife:
 Queen Munmok (문목왕후 김씨), of the Kim clan, daughter of Kum Chung–gong (김충공)
 Son: Kim Gye–myeong (김계명)
 Daughter-in-law: Madam Gwanghwa (광화부인)
 Grandson: Gyeongmun of Silla (841–875) –was the 48th ruler of the Korean kingdom of Silla.

See also
Unified Silla
List of Korean monarchs
List of Silla people

References

Silla rulers
838 deaths
Year of birth unknown
9th-century Korean monarchs